Mike Könnecke (born 23 August 1988) is a German professional football striker who plays for FSV Zwickau.

References

External links

1988 births
Living people
People from Wolfsburg
Footballers from Lower Saxony
German footballers
VfL Wolfsburg II players
FC Erzgebirge Aue players
FSV Zwickau players
2. Bundesliga players
3. Liga players
Association football forwards